Skin: The Movie is a 2018 American comedy film written and directed by Ronn Kilby. The film stars Mark Christopher Lawrence, Diane Sargent, Michelle Way, Merrick McCartha and "Shotgun Tom" Kelly.

Plot

After inheriting a porn studio, a Midwestern woman plans to take the money and run. Her late father and a group of weirdos make her reconsider.

Cast

Production
Kilby originally penned a one hundred page script that was entered into the Screenplay Competition at Beverly Hills Film Festival. Years later he realized it was worth rewriting as a smaller project and set up a GoFundMe to fund the film with a micro budget. The rewritten forty page project was shot over twenty days for $15,000. Kilby dedicated the project to his sister Peggy.

Release
The film screened at Idyllwild International Festival of Cinema, Indie Short Fest, Global Indie Film Fest and Hobnobben Film Festival.

Reception

Critical response
In a review by Rome Prisma Film Awards, they found the film interesting, "technically well done" and "the only downside being an original score." Nami Melumad at New York Film Awards praised the film for its direction, performances, storyline, pacing and music. Roy Zafrani at Los Angeles Film Awards said it is “a small indie film with a big heart.” Michelle Way received recognition for a “well done” performance, winning Best Actress at Actor Awards. Mark Christopher Lawrence won for Best Supporting Actor.

Accolades

References

External links
 
 
 
 

2018 films
2010s English-language films
2018 comedy films
American sex comedy films
American screwball comedy films
Films about pornography
Films about inheritances
Films set in Minneapolis
Films set in Los Angeles
Films set in San Diego
Films shot in San Diego
2010s American films
2010s sex comedy films
2010s screwball comedy films